Clapiers is a commune in the Hérault department in southern France.

Population

Twin towns
Clapiers is twinned with:
 Celestynów, Poland
 Collelongo, Italy
 Toma, Burkina Faso

See also
Communes of the Hérault department

References

Communes of Hérault